Rudolph Dohnberg (10 April 1864 – 17 August 1918) was a Baltic German architect.

Dohnberg was born in Riga, where he also lived and worked for the larger part of his life. He studied under Wilhelm Bockslaff and graduated from Riga Polytechnic Institute (present-day Riga Technical University) in 1893. From 1894, he was active as an architect in Riga. He designed over 80 multi-storey apartment buildings in the city, most in Art Nouveau style. He died in Kassel, Germany.

Examples of buildings by Rudolph Dohnberg

See also
Art Nouveau architecture in Riga

References

Architects from Riga
1864 births
1918 deaths
Art Nouveau architects
Riga Technical University alumni